The men's 1500 metres event at the 1936 Olympic Games took place August 4 and August 6. Forty-three athletes from 27 nations competed. The maximum number of athletes per nation had been set at 3 since the 1930 Olympic Congress. The final was won by Kiwi Jack Lovelock in world record time. It was New Zealand's first medal in the 1500 metres. Glenn Cunningham's silver put the United States on the 1500 metres podium for the first time since 1920. Luigi Beccali did not successfully defend his 1932 gold, but took bronze to become the first man to win two medals in the event.

Background

This was the 10th appearance of the event, which is one of 12 athletics events to have been held at every Summer Olympics. The event had an impressive field. Six of the top seven runners from the 1932 Games returned, including all three medalists: gold medalist Luigi Beccali of Italy, silver medalist Jerry Cornes of Great Britain, bronze medalist Phil Edwards of Canada, fourth-place finisher Glenn Cunningham of the United States, fifth-place finisher Eric Ny of Sweden, and seventh-place finisher Jack Lovelock of New Zealand. All six were contenders in 1936, along with Sydney Wooderson of Great Britain and Archie San Romani and Gene Venzke of the United States (world record holder Bill Bonthron could not make the team against Cunningham, Venzke, and San Romani).

Chile, the Republic of China, Colombia, Luxembourg, and Peru each made their first appearance in the event. The United States made its 10th appearance, the only nation to have competed in the men's 1500 metres at each Games to that point.

Competition format

The competition consisted of two rounds, the format used since 1908. The number of semifinals was back up to four, with 10 or 11 runners in each. The top three runners in each heat advanced to the final, resulting in the typical 12-man final race.

Records

These were the standing world and Olympic records prior to the 1936 Summer Olympics.

In the final Jack Lovelock set a new world record at 3:47.8. Lovelock and silver medalist Glenn Cunningham were both under the old world record; the top five finishers were all under the old Olympic record time.

Schedule

Results

Semifinals

The fastest three runners in each of the four heats advanced to the final round.

Semifinal 1

Semifinal 2

Semifinal 3

Semifinal 4

Final

References

Athletics at the 1936 Summer Olympics
1500 metres at the Olympics
Men's events at the 1936 Summer Olympics